This is a list of defunct airlines of Argentina.

See also

 List of airlines of Argentina
 List of airports in Argentina

References

Argentina